Acrolophus mora, the dark acrolophus, is a moth of the family Acrolophidae. It was described by Augustus Radcliffe Grote in 1881. It is found in North America, including Florida, Georgia, Illinois, Kentucky, Maryland, Massachusetts, Mississippi, New Hampshire, New York, North Carolina, Ohio, Quebec, South Carolina, Tennessee, Virginia and West Virginia.

The wingspan is about 20 mm for males and 26 mm for females.

References

Moths described in 1881
mora